Donji Srb is a village and former settlement in Croatia.

Population

Till 2011 census, Donji Srb was independent settlement. It was unified with settlement of Gornji Srb in new settlement of Srb. As independent settlement it included hamlets of Ajderovac, Donji Srb, Kruškovača and Podastrana.

Note: Settlements of Donji Srb and Gornji Srb are administratively recognized as independent settlements in 1890 and 1900, and then from  1948-2001. From 1857-1880, and 1910-1931 it was part of that time independent settlement of Srb, for which it include data. In 2011 it finished its existence as independent settlement and became part of newformed settlement of Srb.

1991 census

According to the 1991 census, settlement of Donji Srb had 1,098 inhabitants, which were ethnically declared as this:

Austro-hungarian 1910 census

According to the 1910 census, settlement of Donji Srb had 1,257 inhabitants in 3 hamlets, which were linguistically and religiously declared as this:

Note: In 1910 census include data for former settlement of Gornji Srb.

Literature 

  Savezni zavod za statistiku i evidenciju FNRJ i SFRJ, popis stanovništva 1948, 1953, 1961, 1971, 1981. i 1991. godine.
 Book: "Narodnosni i vjerski sastav stanovništva Hrvatske, 1880-1991: po naseljima, author: Jakov Gelo, izdavač: Državni zavod za statistiku Republike Hrvatske, 1998., ;

References

Populated places in Zadar County
Lika